Dadrahman may refer to:
 Dadrahman Badfar
 Dadrahman Bazar (disambiguation)